Comox Valley was a provincial electoral district for the Legislative Assembly of British Columbia, Canada. Most of it is now in Courtenay-Comox.

Since the 1986 BC general election, the riding had been a bellwether, having voted consistently for a governing MLA.

Demographics

Geography

History

Member of Legislative Assembly 

Don McRae of the Liberal Party was elected MLA of the district in the 2009 provincial general election. He was re-elected in the 2013 election.

Election results 

|-

|-
 
|NDP
|Evelyn Gillespie
|align="right"|5,356
|align="right"|19.37%
|align="right"|
|align="right"|$23,476

|-
 
|NDP
|Evelyn Gillespie
|align="right"|13,230
|align="right"|42.76%
|align="right"|
|align="right"|$38,658

|-

|Independent
|Alicia Burns
|align="right"|598
|align="right"|1.93%
|align="right"|
|align="right"|$8,325

|Independent
|Angus Ramsey
|align="right"|149
|align="right"|0.48%
|align="right"|
|align="right"|$924

|Independent
|Hillel Alan Wright
|align="right"|57
|align="right"|0.18%
|align="right"|
|align="right"|

|-
 
|NDP
|Margaret Lord
|align="right"|10,355
|align="right"|39.20%
|align="right"|
|align="right"|$40,813
|-

|Green Go
|Hillel A. Wright
|align="right"|93
|align="right"|0.35%
|align="right"|
|align="right"|

|Independent
|Daniel J. Downer
|align="right"|49
|align="right"|0.19%
|align="right"|
|align="right"|$363

External links 
BC Stats Profile – 2001
Results of 2001 election (pdf)
2001 Expenditures
Results of 1996 election
1996 Expenditures
Results of 1991 election
1991 Expenditures
Website of the Legislative Assembly of British Columbia

Courtenay, British Columbia
Former provincial electoral districts of British Columbia